Marcus A. Cromartie (born December 3, 1990) is a former American football cornerback. He played college football at Wisconsin, and signed with the San Diego Chargers as an undrafted free agent in 2013.

Early years
Ranked as the 43rd best defensive back prospect in the nation by Rivals.com along with 57th best prospect by Scout.com. He was among the Top 100 players in the state of Texas. He was selected to the PrepTicket all-state team and also was a Texashsfootball.com honorable mention all-state team. He was named to second-team all-district in his junior season. He was selected to the first-team all-district and all-area team in his senior season in high school. Cromartie attended Mansfield Timberview High School in Arlington, Texas.

Professional career

San Diego Chargers
On April 27, 2013, Cromartie signed with the San Diego Chargers as an undrafted free agent. On December 16, 2013, he was promoted to the active roster.

Cleveland Browns
On October 29, 2014, Cromartie was signed to the Cleveland Browns' practice squad but was released the next day.

San Francisco 49ers
On November 18, 2014, Cromartie was signed to the San Francisco 49ers' practice squad. On September 5, 2015, he was released by the 49ers during final roster cuts and was signed to the practice squad the next day. After cornerbacks Tramaine Brock and Kenneth Acker sustained injuries, Cromartie was promoted to the active roster and made his first start of 2015 on November 8, 2015 against the Falcons, recording seven tackles. He appeared in eight games in 2015, recording 12 tackles and two pass deflections.

Buffalo Bills
On April 7, 2017, Cromartie signed with the Buffalo Bills. On May 11, 2017, he was waived by the Bills.

Seattle Seahawks
On May 31, 2017, Cromartie was signed by the Seattle Seahawks. He was placed on injured reserve on September 2, 2017. He was released on September 11, 2017.

Houston Texans
On October 4, 2017 Cromartie was signed by the Houston Texans. He was released on October 14, 2017.

Detroit Lions
On August 19, 2018, Cromartie signed with the Detroit Lions. He was placed on injured reserve on August 31, 2018. He was released on September 18, 2018.

Montreal Alouettes
In April 2019, Cromartie signed with the Montreal Alouettes of the CFL. In the first game of the season, Cromartie recorded seven tackles, and recovered a fumble that was forced by teammate Tommie Campbell. However this was his only game; Cromartie suffered an injury and was placed on the 6 game injured list. After recovering and coming off the list, he was released on August 7th.

Personal life
He is a cousin of former NFL cornerbacks Dominique Rodgers-Cromartie and Antonio Cromartie.

References

External links
 San Diego Chargers bio
 Wisconsin Badgers bio

1990 births
Living people
People from Mansfield, Texas
Players of American football from Texas
American football cornerbacks
Wisconsin Badgers football players
San Diego Chargers players
Cleveland Browns players
San Francisco 49ers players
Buffalo Bills players
Seattle Seahawks players
Houston Texans players
Detroit Lions players
Montreal Alouettes players
Canadian football defensive backs
American players of Canadian football